Arabic English may refer to:

Arabic-English Lexicon
List of Arabic loanwords in English

See also
British Arabs
Arab American
Arab Australian
Arab Canadians